is a city located in Ibaraki Prefecture, Japan. , the city had an estimated population of 104,329 in 44,755 households and a population density of 1492 persons per km². The percentage of the population aged over 65 was 34.8%.

Geography
Located in southern Ibaraki Prefecture, Toride is bordered by Chiba Prefecture to the south. The Tone River passes along the southern border of Toride, which also marks the Ibaraki/Chiba border. The city is located in the Kanto Plain and was often subject to flooding. It is approximately 40 kilometers from central Tokyo.

Surrounding municipalities
Ibaraki Prefecture
 Tsukubamirai
 Moriya
Ryūgasaki
Tone
Chiba Prefecture
Abiko
Kashiwa

Climate
Toride has a Humid continental climate (Köppen Cfa) characterized by warm summers and cool winters with light snowfall.  The average annual temperature in Toride is 14.4 °C. The average annual rainfall is 1320 mm with September as the wettest month. The temperatures are highest on average in August, at around 24.6 °C, and lowest in January, at around 3.6 °C.

Demographics
Per Japanese census data, the population of Toride peaked around the year 2000 and has declined slightly since.

History
Toride developed in the Edo period as a post town on the Mito Kaidō highway connecting Edo with Mito and as a nexus for water-borne traffic on the Tone River; however, the name is thought to derive from an ancient fort constructed by Taira no Masakado in the Heian period. The area was part of ancient Shimōsa Province, but was transferred to the newly created Ibaraki prefecture after the Meiji restoration. Toride town was created with the establishment of the modern municipalities system on April 1, 1889. It was elevated to city status on October 1, 1970. On March 28, 2005, the neighboring town of Fujishiro (from Kitasōma District) was merged into Toride, nearly doubling its size.

Government
Toride has a mayor-council form of government with a directly elected mayor and a unicameral city council of 24 members. Toride contributes two members to the Ibaraki Prefectural Assembly. In terms of national politics, the city is part of Ibaraki 3rd district of the lower house of the Diet of Japan.

Economy
Due to its proximity to Tokyo, Toride is increasingly a bedroom community for the Tokyo metropolis. Rice, sake, pickles and leeks dominate local agriculture.

Education
Toride has 14 public elementary schools and six public middle schools operated by the city government, and five public high schools operated by the Ibaraki Prefectural Board of Education. In addition, there are one private elementary school, two private middle schools and two private high schools.

The Tokyo University of the Arts maintains a campus at Toride.

Transportation

Railway
 JR East – Jōban Line
 - 
Kantō Railway - Jōsō Line
  -  -  -  -  -  -

Highway

Sister city relations
 – Guilin, Guangxi, China
 – Yuba City, California, USA

Notable people from Toride
 Kiyoshi Mutō, architect and structural engineer (considered the "father of the Japanese skyscraper") 
 Kakeru Ayabe, professional baseball player (pitcher for the Yokohama DeNA BayStars)
 Takako Inoue, professional wrestler (All Japan Women's Pro-Wrestling, Ladies Legend Pro-Wrestling, Oz Academy and Arsion)
 Yoshinari Ogawa, professional wrestler (Pro Wrestling Noah)

Local attractions
Kokai River Cycling Road
Toride Tone River Fireworks
Kokaigawa Flower Canal
Toride Yasaka Shrine 
Former Toride-juku Honjin 
Ryuzen-ji Buddhist temple
Tomb of Honda Narishige

References

External links

Official Website 

Cities in Ibaraki Prefecture
Toride, Ibaraki